Canning Mills is a suburb of Perth, Western Australia in the City of Kalamunda. The suburb was gazetted on 22 September 1972. Its name relates to the Canning River.

It was the terminus and main destination of the Canning Jarrah Timber Company-constructed Upper Darling Range Railway during the early stages of its operation until 1912 when the line was extended.

References

External links

Suburbs of Perth, Western Australia
Darling Range
Suburbs in the City of Kalamunda